Glenea papuensis is a species of beetle in the family Cerambycidae. It was described by Charles Joseph Gahan in 1897. It is known from Indonesia.

Subspecies
 Glenea papuensis bivittipennis Breuning, 1958
 Glenea papuensis papuensis Gahan, 1897

References

papuensis
Beetles described in 1897